The Lower Rio Grande Valley National Wildlife Refuge is a  National Wildlife Refuge located in the Lower Rio Grande Valley region of southern Texas.

It is along the northern banks and reaches of the Lower Rio Grande, north of the Mexico—United States international border.

Ecology
Only 5% of the native riparian, floodplain, and wetland habitats remain along the lower Rio Grande and its local tributaries, but the diversity within these fragments adds up to a significant 1,200 species of native plants, 700 species of vertebrates (including nearly 500 bird species), and 300 species of butterflies. Eleven different biological communities exist on the National Wildlife Refuge, from the Chihuahuan Desert thorn forest to tidal wetlands.

Wildlife includes the rare ocelot, crested caracara, Mexican bluewing butterfly, great kiskadee, red-billed pigeon, Altamira oriole, ringed kingfisher, and green jay.

The refuge is designated as part of the Great Texas Coastal Birding Trail, a network of wildlife-viewing sites throughout the Texas coastal regions.

See also

References

External links
Southwest.fws.gov: Official Lower Rio Grande Valley National Wildlife Refuge website

National Wildlife Refuges in Texas
Lower Rio Grande Valley
Wetlands of Texas
Protected areas of Zapata County, Texas
Protected areas of Starr County, Texas
Protected areas of Hidalgo County, Texas
Protected areas of Cameron County, Texas
Landforms of Zapata County, Texas
Landforms of Starr County, Texas
Landforms of Hidalgo County, Texas
Landforms of Cameron County, Texas
Protected areas established in 1979
1979 establishments in Texas